The National Basketball League Most Efficient Player was an annual National Basketball League (NBL) award given between 1990 and 1997. After 1997, the award was discontinued because Andrew Gaze was the only player winning the award.

Winners

References

Most Efficient Player
Awards established in 1990
Awards disestablished in 1997